The 2007 World Short Track Speed Skating Championships took place between 9 and 11 March 2007 in Milan, Italy. The World Championships were organised by the ISU which also run world cups and championships in speed skating and figure skating.

Results

Men

* First place is awarded 34 points, second is awarded 21 points, third is awarded 13 points, fourth is awarded 8 points, fifth is awarded 5 points, sixth is awarded 3 points, seventh is awarded 2 points, and eighth is awarded 1 point in the finals of each individual race to determine the overall world champion. The relays do not count for the overall classification.

Women

* First place is awarded 34 points, second is awarded 21 points, third is awarded 13 points, fourth is awarded 8 points, fifth is awarded 5 points, sixth is awarded 3 points, seventh is awarded 2 points, and eighth is awarded 1 point in the finals of each individual race to determine the overall world champion. The relays do not count for the overall classification.

Medal table

External links
 Official Site
 ISU Results
 Results book

W
World Short Track Speed Skating Championships
W
International speed skating competitions hosted by Italy
Sports competitions in Milan
World Short Track
2000s in Milan